Six Earnest-class destroyers served with the Royal Navy: , , , ,  and .  These ships were all built by Cammell Laird and were part of the class of 'thirty knotters'.

The boats were not able to make this speed in bad weather, where they were usually wet and uncomfortable with cramped crew quarters, but they proved their toughness in serving through World War I, despite being twenty years old. Thanks to their watertight bulkheads, their thin plating and light structure they were able to take a great deal of damage and remain afloat, although their plates buckled easily, affecting their handling.

They were armed with the standard 12-pounder gun and two torpedo tubes and carried a complement of 63 officers and ratings.

In 1913 the Ernest class, along with all other surviving "30 knotter" vessels with 4 funnels, were classified by the Admiralty as the B-class to provide some system to the naming of HM destroyers (at the same time, the 3-funnelled, "30 knotters" became the C-class and the 2-funnelled ships the D-class).

References

Bibliography

 

Destroyer classes
 
Ship classes of the Royal Navy